Gundega is a Latvian given name and may refer to: 
Gundega Cenne (1933–2009), Canadian artist
Gundega Repše (born 1960), Latvian writer
Gundega Sproģe (born 1972), Latvian triple jumper

Latvian feminine given names
Feminine given names